This Is Me... Now is the upcoming ninth studio album by American entertainer Jennifer Lopez. The album is scheduled to be released in 2023. The record is a sequel to Lopez's third studio album This Is Me... Then (2002). It is her first studio album in nine years, since A.K.A. (2014).

Background
On November 25, 2022, the 20th anniversary of the release of This Is Me... Then (2002), Lopez announced her ninth studio album, This Is Me... Now with a video she released on her social media, featuring her recreating that album's cover which morphs into a photograph for the new album. The album will include a sequel to that album's song "Dear Ben" titled "Dear Ben Pt. II". Lopez described the album as an "emotional, spiritual, and psychological journey she has taken over the past two decades." The albums lyrics are very confessional with Lopez discussing the reputation of her love life. She stated that "People think they know things about what happened to me along the way, the men I was with—but they really have no idea, and a lot of times they get it so wrong. There's a part of me that was hiding a side of myself from everyone. And I feel like I'm at a place in my life, finally, where I have something to say about it."

Recording and production
During an interview with Zane Lowe on Apple Music, Lopez confirmed that she worked primarily with a small group of producers on the album. It was primarily produced by Rogét Chahayed, Jeff "Gitty" Gitelman and Angel Lopez. Others like Kim "Kaydence" Krysiuk also joined the production team. This Is Me... Now was written and produced from May to August 2022, amidst Lopez's reunion and marriage to her ex Ben Affleck. Lopez confirmed that the reunion inspired her to get back into the studio and write honest music, in ways that she had not done since This Is Me... Then (2002).

Track listing 
"This Is Me... Now"
"To Be Yours"
"Mad in Love"
"Can't Get Enough" 
"Rebound"
"Not. Going. Anywhere."
"Dear Ben Pt. II"
"Hummingbird"
"Hearts and Flowers"
"Broken Like Me"
"This Time Around"
"Midnight Trip to Vegas"
"Greatest Love Story Never Told"

References

Jennifer Lopez albums
2023 albums
Sequel albums
Upcoming albums